Xenarchus is a genus of moths of the Aididae family.

Species
 Xenarchus admirabilis
 Xenarchus carmen

References

Zygaenoidea
Zygaenoidea genera